Paul Burns is an Irish lawyer who has been a judge of the High Court of Ireland since March 2020. He previously practised as a barrister with a focus on criminal trials.

Early life 
Burns attended Trinity College Dublin where he obtained a bachelor's degree in legal science in 1984 and a Master of Letters in law in 1987.

Legal career 
He became a barrister in 1986 and became a senior counsel in 2004. His practice was predominantly focused on criminal law, appearing for both accused persons and the Director of Public Prosecutions. Among the trials he has been involved with included serious offences of murder, sexual offences and drug offences. He has also acted in actions involving judicial review, constitutional law, personal injuries and defamation.

In 1998 he appeared in the Special Criminal Court for Paul Ward in his trial for the murder of Veronica Guerin and in 2003 in the Court of Criminal Appeal for Catherine Nevin in an appeal of her murder conviction. He represented former judge Brian Curtin at trial and in Oireachtas proceedings and later former judge Heather Perrin in her trial for false accounting. In 2007 he was counsel for the Garda Síochána in a case for damages taken by Frank McBrearty Snr and appeared for solicitor Michael Lynn in preliminary hearings. Burns has also represented the wife of John Gilligan in civil proceedings and, in defamation actions against media organisations, Declan Ganley, Paddy McKillen and Denis O'Brien. He prosecuted cases against Thomas "Slab" Murphy and against a man accused of the shooting of Gareth Hutch.

He was appointed to the Electronic Communications Appeals Panel in 2005.

Judicial career 
Burns was nominated to become a judge of the High Court of Ireland in December 2019 and was appointed in March 2020. The vacancy was created following Donald Binchy becoming a judge of the Court of Appeal.

He has heard cases involving extradition and bail applications. In October 2020 he refused to order the extradition of Ian Bailey to France for trial arising from the death of Sophie Toscan du Plantier. He has also presided over cases involving personal injuries, medical negligence and homicide.

Coffey is a judge of the Special Criminal Court.

References 

Living people
High Court judges (Ireland)
Irish barristers
Alumni of Trinity College Dublin
Alumni of King's Inns
Year of birth missing (living people)